Arapaoa Island (formerly spelled Arapawa Island) is an island located in the Marlborough Sounds, at the north east tip of the South Island of New Zealand. Queen Charlotte Sound defines its western side, while to the south lies Tory Channel, which is on the sea route between Wellington in the North Island to Picton. Cook Strait's narrowest point is between Arapaoa Island's Perano Head and Cape Terawhiti in the North Island.

History
According to Māori oral tradition, the island was where the great navigator Kupe killed the octopus Te Wheke-a-Muturangi.

It was from a hill on Arapaoa Island in 1770 that Captain James Cook first saw the sea passage from the Pacific Ocean to the Tasman Sea, which was named Cook Strait.  This discovery banished the fond notion of geographers that there existed a great southern continent, Terra Australis. A monument at Cook's Lookout was erected in 1970.

From the late 1820s until the mid-1960s, Arapaoa Island was a base for whaling in the Sounds. John Guard established a shore station at Te Awaiti in 1827, however initially could only salvage baleen until the station was equipped to process whale oil from 1830 onwards, targeting right whales. Later, the station at Perano Head on the east coast of the island was used to hunt humpback whales from 1911 to 1964 (see Whaling in New Zealand). The houses built by the Perano family are now operated as tourist accommodations.

In the 2000s the former whalers from the Perano and Heberley families, who live on Arapawa, joined a Department of Conservation whale spotting programme to assess how the humpback whale population has recovered since the end of whaling.

In August 2014, the spelling of the island's name was officially altered from Arapawa to Arapaoa.

Aircraft accident
The 11,000-volt power lines linking the mainland and Arapaoa Island over Tory Channel was struck by an Air Albatross Cessna 402 commuter aircraft in 1985. The crash was witnessed by many passengers on an inter-island Cook Strait ferry. The ferry immediately stopped to dispatch a rescue lifeboat. Along with the two pilots, one entire family died, and all but a young girl from the other. No bodies were ever found. The sole survivor (Cindy Mosey) was travelling with her family and the other family from Nelson to Wellington to attend a gymnastics competition. The Arapaoa Island crash caused public confidence in Air Albatross to falter, contributing to the company going into liquidation in December of that year.

Conservation
Parts of the island have been heavily cleared of native vegetation in the past through burning and logging, A number of pine forests were planted on the island. Wilding pines, an invasive species in some parts of New Zealand, are being poisoned on the island to allow the regenerating native vegetation to grow. About  at Ruaomoko Point on the south-eastern portion of the island will be killed by drilling holes into the trees and injecting poison.

Arapaoa Island is known for the breeds of pigs, sheep and goats found only on the island. These became established in the 19th century, but the origin of these breeds is uncertain, and a matter of some speculation. Common suggestions are that they are old English breeds introduced by the early whalers, or by Captain Cook or other early explorers.  These breeds are now extinct in England, and the goats surviving in a sanctuary on the island are now also bred in other parts of New Zealand and in the northern hemisphere.

The small Brothers Islands, which lie off the northeast coast of Arapaoa Island, are a sanctuary for the rare Brothers Island tuatara.

See also 
 List of islands of New Zealand

References

Further reading 

 Philp, Matt. 2011. The Sound of the Sea. New Zealand Geographic, 110.
 Heberley, Heather. 1996. Weather permitting. Whatamango Bay, N.Z. : Cape Catley. 
 Heberley, Heather. 1997. Flood tide. Whatamango Bay, N.Z. : Cape Catley.

External links

 Arapawa Goats
 Arapawa Pigs
 Arapawa Sheep

Islands of the Marlborough Sounds
Whaling stations in New Zealand
Whaling in New Zealand
Cook Strait Ferry
Populated places in the Marlborough Sounds